The Intelligent Investor by Benjamin Graham, first published in 1949, is a widely acclaimed book on value investing. The book provides strategies on how to successfully use value investing in the stock market. Historically, the book has been one of the most popular books on investing and Graham’s legacy remains.

Background and history 
The Intelligent Investor is based on value investing, an investment approach Graham began teaching at Columbia Business School in 1928 and subsequently refined with David Dodd. This sentiment was echoed by other Graham disciples such as Irving Kahn and Walter Schloss. Warren Buffett read the book at age 20 and began using the value investing taught by Graham to build his own investment portfolio.

The Intelligent Investor also marks a significant deviation to stock selection from Graham's earlier works, such as Security Analysis. Which is, instead of extensive analysis on an individual company, just apply simple earning criteria and buy a group of companies. He explained the change as:

Analysis

Value investing 
Graham’s main investment approach outlined in The Intelligent Investor is that of value investing. Value investing is an investment strategy that targets undervalued stocks of companies that have the capabilities as businesses to perform well in the long run. Value investing is not concerned with short term trends in the market or daily movements of stocks. This is because value investing strategies believe the market overreacts to price changes in the short term, without taking into account a company’s fundamentals for long-term growth. In its most basic terms, value investing is based on the premise that if you know the true value of a stock, then you can save lots of money if you can buy that stock on sale.

Mr. Market 

One of Graham's important allegories is that of Mr. Market, meant to personify the irrationality and group-think of the stock market. Mr. Market is an obliging fellow who turns up every day at the shareholder's door offering to buy or sell his shares at a different price. Often, the price quoted by Mr. Market seems plausible, but sometimes it is ridiculous. The investor is free to either agree with his quoted price and trade with him, or ignore him completely. Mr. Market doesn't mind this, and will be back the following day to quote another price.

The point of this anecdote is that the investor should not regard the whims of Mr. Market as a determining factor in the value of the shares the investor owns. He should profit from market folly rather than participate in it. A common fallacy in the market is that investors are reasonable and homogenous, but Mr. Market serves to show that this is not the case. The investor is advised to concentrate on the real life performance of his companies and receiving dividends, rather than be too concerned with Mr. Market's often irrational behavior.

Determining value 
In The Intelligent Investor, Graham explains the importance of determining value when investing. In order to invest for value successfully and avoid participating in short-term market booms and busts, determining the value of companies is essential. To determine value, investors use fundamental analysis. Mathematically, by multiplying forecasted earnings over a certain number of years times a capitalization factor of a company, value can be determined and then compared to the actual price of a stock. There are five factors that are included in determining the capitalization factor, which are long-term growth prospects, quality of management, financial strength and capital structure, dividend record, and current dividend rate. To understand these factors, value investors look at a company's financials, such as annual reports, cash flow statements and EBITDA, and company executives’s forecasts and performance. This information is all available online as it is required for each public company by the SEC.

Reception 
Benjamin Graham is regarded as the father of value investing and The Intelligent Investor was highly regarded by the public and remains so. Ronald Moy, professor of economics and finance at St. John’s University, explains that “The influence of Graham's methodology is indisputable. His disciples represent a virtual who's who of value investors, including Warren Buffett, Bill Ruane, and Walter Schloss”. Warren Buffett is regarded as a brilliant investor and Graham’s best-known disciple. According to Buffett, The Intelligent Investor is “By far the best book on investing ever written.” Ken Faulkberry, founder of Arbor Investment Planner, claims, “If you could only buy one investment book in your lifetime, this would probably be the one”. Many of Graham’s investment strategies explained in the book remain useful today despite massive growth and change in the economy. Scholar Kenneth D. Roose of Oberlin College writes, “Graham’s book continues to provide one of the clearest, most readable, and wisest discussions of the problems of the average investor”. The Intelligent Investor was received with praise from economic scholars and everyday investors and continues to be a premier investing book today.

Editions 
Since the work was published in 1949 Graham revised it several times, most recently in 1971–72. This was published in 1973 as the "Fourth Revised Edition" , and it included a preface and appendices by Warren Buffett. Graham died in 1976. Commentaries and new footnotes were added to the fourth edition by Jason Zweig, and this new revision was published in 2003.

The Intelligent Investor (Re-issue of the 1949 edition) by Benjamin Graham. Collins, 2005, 269 pages. .
The Intelligent Investor by Benjamin Graham, 1949, 1954, 1959, 1965(Library of Congress Catalog Card Number 64-7552) by Harper & Row Publishers Inc, New York.
The Intelligent Investor (Revised 1973 edition) by Benjamin Graham and Jason Zweig. HarperBusiness Essentials, 2003, 640 pages. .

An unabridged audio version of the Revised Edition of The Intelligent Investor was also released on July 7, 2015.

Book contents 

2003 edition
 Introduction: What This Book Expects to Accomplish
 Commentary on the Introduction 
Investment versus Speculation: Results to Be Expected by the Intelligent Investor
The Investor and Inflation
A Century of Stock Market History: The Level of Stock Market Prices in Early 1972
General Portfolio Policy: The Defensive Investor
The Defensive Investor and Common Stocks
Portfolio Policy for the Enterprising Investor: Negative Approach
Portfolio Policy for the Enterprising Investor: The Positive Side
The Investor and Market Fluctuations
Investing in Investment Funds
The Investor and His Advisers
Security Analysis for the Lay Investor: General Approach
Things to Consider About Per-Share Earnings
A Comparison of Four Listed Companies
Stock Selection for the Defensive Investor
Stock Selection for the Enterprising Investor
Convertible Issues and Warrants
Four Extremely Instructive Case Histories and more
A Comparison of Eight Pairs of Companies
Shareholders and Managements: Dividend Policy
"Margin of Safety" as the Central Concept of Investment
 Postscript
 Commentary on Postscript
 Appendixes
The Superinvestors of Graham-and-Doddsville
Important Rules Concerning Taxability of Investment Income and Security Transactions (in 1972)
The Basics of Investment Taxation (Updated as of 2003)
The New Speculation in Common Stocks
A Case History: Aetna Maintenance Co.
Tax Accounting for NVF's Acquisition of Sharon Steel Shares
Technological Companies as Investments
 Endnotes
 Index

See also 
 Benjamin Graham formula
 Security Analysis (book)

References

Further reading
 Williams, John Burr. The Theory of Investment Value.

1949 non-fiction books
Finance books
Harper & Brothers books